Tzvika Hadar is an Israeli international lawn bowler.

Bowls career
He has represented Israel at three World Championships; the 2004 World Outdoor Bowls Championship, the 2012 World Outdoor Bowls Championship and the 2016 World Outdoor Bowls Championship.

In 2011, he won a bronze medal at the European Bowls Championships in Portugal and won a pairs bronze medal (with Daniel Alonim), at the 2015 Atlantic Bowls Championships.

Hadar was selected as part of the five man team by Israel for the 2020 World Outdoor Bowls Championship 

He has served as the European Bowls Union President.

References

Israeli male bowls players
Living people
Year of birth missing (living people)